Dr. A.P.J. Abdul Kalam University is a private university in Indore, Madhya Pradesh, India. It is named after A.P.J. Abdul Kalam, the former President of India.

See also

List of universities in India
List of institutions of higher education in Madhya Pradesh

References

External links
 

Private universities in India
Educational institutions established in 2016
Universities and colleges in Indore
2016 establishments in Madhya Pradesh
Memorials to A. P. J. Abdul Kalam